The Arleigh Burke class of guided-missile destroyers (DDGs) is a United States Navy class of destroyer centered around the Aegis Combat System and the SPY-1D multi-function passive electronically scanned array radar. The class is named for Admiral Arleigh Burke, an American destroyer officer in World War II and later Chief of Naval Operations.

These warships are multi-mission destroyers able to conduct anti-aircraft warfare (AAW) with Aegis and surface-to-air missiles; tactical land strikes with Tomahawk missiles; anti-submarine warfare (ASW) with towed array sonar, anti-submarine rockets, and ASW helicopters; and anti-surface warfare (ASuW) with Harpoon missiles. With upgrades to their AN/SPY-1 phased radar systems and their associated missile payloads as part of the Aegis Ballistic Missile Defense System, ships of this class have also demonstrated capability as mobile anti-ballistic missile and anti-satellite platforms. 

The lead ship of the class, was commissioned during Admiral Burke's lifetime on 4 July 1991. The Arleigh Burke class has the longest production run for any U.S. Navy surface combatant. 70 are active as of May 2022, with more planned to enter service.

Characteristics

Variants
The Arleigh Burke-class destroyers have four separate variants, referred to as "Flights". Newer Flights enabled the incorporation of technological advancements. 
Flight I: DDGs 51–71
Flight II: DDGs 72–78
Flight IIA: DDGs 79–124 and DDG-127
Flight III: DDGs 125–126 and DDG-128 onwards

Structure
The Arleigh Burke class was designed with a new large, water-plane area-hull form characterized by a wide flaring bow, which significantly improves seakeeping ability and permits high speed in high sea states. The class's design incorporates stealth techniques, such as the angled (rather than traditional vertical) surfaces and the raked tripod mainmast, which make the ship more difficult to detect by radar.

For these destroyers, the U.S. Navy returned to all-steel construction, except the mast made of aluminum. The Ticonderogas had combined a steel hull with a superstructure made of lighter aluminum to reduce top weight, but the lighter metal proved vulnerable to cracking. Aluminum is also less fire-resistant than steel; a 1975 fire aboard  gutted her aluminum superstructure. Battle damage to Royal Navy ships exacerbated by their aluminum superstructures during the 1982 Falklands War supported the decision to use steel. Other lessons from the Falklands War led to the Navy's decision to protect the Arleigh Burke class's vital spaces with double-spaced steel layers, which create a buffer against anti-ship missiles (AShMs), and Kevlar spall liners.

Passive defenses
Arleigh Burke destroyers are equipped with AN/SLQ-32 electronic warfare (EW) suites that provide electronic support. Vessels with the SLQ-32(V)3 or SLQ-32(V)6 variant have an additional capability to jam targeting and AShM guidance radar.

The destroyers have Mark 36 infrared and chaff decoy launchers, as well as Nulka decoy launchers, for spoofing incoming anti-ship missiles. For defeating incoming torpedoes, the class has two Nixie towed countermeasures. The ships' Prairie-Maskers can reduce their radiated noise.

A collective protection system makes the Arleigh Burke class the first U.S. warships designed with an air-filtration system against nuclear, biological, and chemical warfare (NBC). Other NBC defenses include double air-locked hatches, pressurized compartments, and an external countermeasure washdown system. The class's electronics are hardened against electromagnetic pulses (EMPs). Fire suppression equipment includes water sprinklers in the living quarters and Combat Information Center (CIC). The CIC is below the waterline.

Weapon systems
The Arleigh Burke class are multi-mission ships with numerous combat systems, including anti-aircraft missiles, land attack missiles, ship-to-ship missiles, and an anti-submarine warfare (ASW) system. Missiles are stored in and fired from Mark 41 Vertical Launching System (VLS) cells; with 90 cells on Flights I–II and 96 cells starting with Flight IIA, the Arleigh Burkes are more armed than many preceding guided-missile cruiser classes. The Arleigh Burke-class destroyer is equipped with the Aegis Combat System, which combines information from the ship's sensors to display a coherent image of the environment and guides weapons to targets using advanced tracking and fire control.

Their main radar differs from traditional mechanically rotating radars. Instead, Aegis uses the AN/SPY-1D passive electronically scanned array (or the AN/SPY-6 active electronically scanned array on Flight III ships), which allows continual tracking of targets simultaneous to area scans. The system's computer control also allows centralization of the previously separate tracking and targeting functions. The system is resistant to electronic countermeasures.

The Standard Missile SM-2MR/ER and SM-6 provide area air defense, though they may also be used in a secondary ASuW role. The SM-2 uses semi-active radar homing (SARH), meaning that up to three targets may be simultaneously intercepted since the Arleigh Burkes have three AN/SPG-62 fire-control radars for terminal target illumination. The SM-6, which provides over-the-horizon defense, and the SM-2 Block IIIC feature a dual-mode seeker with active radar homing (ARH) capability; they do not have to rely on external illumination, so more targets could theoretically be intercepted simultaneously.

Flight IIA and III destroyers carry RIM-162 Evolved SeaSparrow Missiles (ESSMs), which provide medium-range defense against missiles and aircraft and are small enough to be quad-packed into a single Mk 41 VLS cell. ESSM is also capable of targeting other ships. ESSM Block 1 uses SARH, guided similarly to older SM-2s. ESSM Block 2 features a dual-mode seeker with ARH capability, and it was scheduled for Initial Operating Capability (IOC) in 2020.

The SM-3, SM-6, and SM-2ER Block IV provide Ballistic Missile Defense (BMD), the SM-3 being an exoatmospheric interceptor and the latter two having terminal phase anti-ballistic capability. So vital has the Aegis BMD role become that all ships of the class are being updated with BMD capability. As of August 2021, there are 42 BMD-capable Arleigh Burke-class destroyers. Flight III ships will be delivered from 2023 with new AN/SPY-6(V)1 radars and improved BMD capabilities; Flight IIA ships are also planned to receive these upgrades with AN/SPY-6(V)4 radar retrofits.

The class can perform tactical land strikes with VLS-launched Tomahawks. With the development of the Tomahawk Block V, all existing Block IV Tomahawks carried will be converted to the Block V. The Tomahawk Block Va version is called the Maritime Strike version, and it provides anti-ship capability in addition to its land attack role. The Block Vb version features the Joint Multi-Effects Warhead System for hitting a wider variety of land targets.

Arleigh Burke-class ships feature the Navy's latest AN/SQQ-89 ASW combat system, which is integrated with Aegis. It encompasses the AN/SQS-53C bow-mounted sonar and a towed array sonar, though several Flight IIA ships do not have a towed array. The towed array is either the AN/SQR-19 Tactical Towed Array Sonar (TACTAS) or the newer TB-37U Multi-Function Towed Array (MFTA). The ships carry standoff RUM-139 anti-submarine rockets, which have a range of 22 km and deploy the Mark 54 ASW torpedo. For short-range defense against submarines, they have two Mark 32 triple torpedo tubes—one to the port side and one to the starboard side—that can fire the Mark 46, Mark 50, and Mark 54 ASW torpedoes. The ships can detect anti-ship mines at a range of about 1,400 meters.

All ships of the class are fitted with at least one Phalanx close-in weapon system (CIWS), which provides point defense against air and surface threats. Eight ships (DDG-51, DDG-64, DDG-71, DDG-75, DDG-78, DDG-80, DDG-84, DDG-117) are equipped with one SeaRAM CIWS to improve their self-defense.

Arleigh Burkes also carry two 25 mm Mk 38 Machine Gun Systems, one on each side of the ship, designed to counter fast surface craft. There are numerous mounts for crew-served weapons like the M2 Browning.

Located on the forward deck is the 5-inch (127 mm) Mark 45 gun. Directed by the Mark 34 Gun Weapon System (GWS), it can be used in anti-ship, close-in anti-aircraft, and naval gunfire support (NGFS) roles. The Mark 45 gun on the Arleigh Burke-class destroyer has an ammunition stowage of 600 shells.

Aircraft

Flights IIA and III are equipped with two hangars for stowing MH-60 helicopters. Their Light Airborne Multi-Purpose System (LAMPS) helicopter system improves the ship's capabilities against submarines and surface ships by enabling the MH-60 to serve as a platform for monitoring submarines and surface ships, launching torpedoes and missiles against them, and providing fire support during insertions/extractions with machine guns and Hellfire anti-armor guided missiles. The helicopters also serve in a utility role, able to perform ship replenishment, search and rescue, medical evacuation, communications relay, and naval gunfire spotting and controlling.

In March 2022, an Arleigh Burke destroyer was deployed with an AAI Aerosonde unmanned aerial vehicle (UAV). The aircraft is under demonstration for Flight I and II ships, which do not have accommodations for permanently storing helicopters. The Aerosonde has a small enough footprint to be stowed on those destroyers. It can perform missions such as intelligence, surveillance, and reconnaissance (ISR) at a much lower cost than manned helicopters.

Development

Origins and Flight I 
The Chief of Naval Operations (CNO) from 1970 to 1974, Admiral Elmo Zumwalt, sought to improve the U.S. fleet through modernization at minimal cost. Zumwalt advocated for a "high-low mix" philosophy. He envisioned the high-low mix as constituted by a few high-end, high-cost warships and numerous low-end, low-cost warships. The introduction of the Aegis-equipped Ticonderoga-class cruiser in the early 1980s filled the high end. The Navy started work to develop a lower-cost Aegis-equipped vessel to fill the low end and replace the aging  destroyers.

In 1980, the U.S. Navy initiated design studies with seven contractors. By 1983, the number of competitors had been reduced to three: Bath Iron Works, Ingalls Shipbuilding, and Todd Shipyards. On 3 April 1985, Bath Iron Works received a US$321.9 million contract to build the first of the class, USS Arleigh Burke. Gibbs & Cox was awarded the contract to be the lead ship design agent. The Navy contracted Ingalls Shipbuilding to build the second ship.

Political restraints led to design restrictions, including the absence of helicopter hangers, a displacement limit of 8,300 tons, and a 50-foot shorter hull than the Ticonderoga's. The designers were forced to make compromises, such as a wide flaring bow. To compensate for the limited length, the originally-planned 80,000 shaft horsepower (shp) LM2500 gas turbines were upgraded to 100,000 shp. An OTO Melara 76 mm as the main gun was under consideration at one point. Despite their constraints, the designers benefitted from insight gained from previous classes; for example, they chose an all-steel superstructure to improve survivability.

The total cost of the first ship was $1.1 billion, the other $778 million being for the ship's weapons systems. USS Arleigh Burke was laid down by the Bath Iron Works at Bath, Maine, on 6 December 1988, and launched on 16 September 1989 by Mrs. Arleigh Burke. The Admiral himself was present at her commissioning ceremony on 4 July 1991, held on the waterfront in downtown Norfolk, Virginia. Orders for Flight I ships continued through 1995.

Flight II 
The Flight II iteration of the class was introduced in FY1992. The incorporation of the AN/SRS-1A(V) Combat Direction Finding enhanced detection of signals. The TADIX-B, JTIDS Command and Control Processor, and Link 16 improved communication with other assets. The SLQ-32 EW suite was upgraded to (V)3, and the SPS-67(V)3 surface search radar was upgraded to (V)5. Flight II also gained the capability to launch and control the SM-2ER Block IV. An expansion of fuel capacity slightly increased the displacement.

Flight IIA 

The Flight IIA design was first procured in FY1994. Among the additions are two hangars and support facilities for ASW helicopters, Cooperative Engagement Capability (CEC), the Kingfisher mine detection system, and five blast-resistant bulkheads. Flight IIA also replaced retractable missile loading cranes on the forward and aft VLS with a total of six additional cells. The propellers are of a different design to reduce cavitation. New fiber optics helped minimize weight gain and improve reliability. Flight IIA ships were initially built without the AN/SQR-19 TACTAS, though later units were subsequently installed with TACTAS.

Later Flight IIA ships starting with  use the BridgeMaster E as their navigation radar instead of the AN/SPS-73(V)12. Subsequent Flight IIA ships employ additional signature-reduction measures: the hangers of DDG-86 onwards are made of composite materials, and the exhaust funnels of DDG-89 onwards are buried within the superstructure.

Several Flight IIA ships were constructed without any Phalanx CIWS because of the planned Evolved SeaSparrow Missile; the Navy had initially decided that ESSM made Phalanx redundant. However, the Navy later changed its mind and decided to retrofit all IIA ships to carry at least one Phalanx CIWS by 2013.

DDGs 91–96 (USS Pinckney, and ) were built with superstructure differences to accommodate the AN/WLD-1 Remote Minehunting System (RMS). However, only DDG-96 was installed with the system before the RMS program was canceled.

Modernization
However, the ERGM was canceled in 2008.

The current modernization program is designed to provide a comprehensive mid-life upgrade to ensure that the class remains effective. Modernization of existing ships helps to provide commonality with production ships. The program's goals are reduced manning, increased mission effectiveness, and reduced total cost—including construction, maintenance, and operation. Modernization technologies were integrated on DDGs 111 and 112 during their construction and retrofitted into Flight I and II ships. The first phase updates the hull, mechanical, and electrical systems, while the second phase introduces an Open Architecture Computing Environment (OACE). The result will be improved capability in both BMD and littoral combat. By 2018, all Arleigh Burke-class ships homeported in the Western Pacific will have upgraded ASW systems, including the new TB-37U Multi-Function Towed Array (MFTA).

Spruance is also the first destroyer to be fitted with the Boeing Company's Gigabit Ethernet Data Multiplex System (GEDMS).

In July 2010, BAE Systems announced it had been awarded a contract to modernize 11 ships. In May 2014, USNI News reported that 21 of the 28 Flight I/II Arleigh Burke-class destroyers would not receive a mid-life upgrade that included electronics and Aegis Baseline 9 software for SM-6 compatibility; instead, they would retain the basic BMD 3.6.1 software in a $170 million upgrade concentrating on mechanical systems, and on some ships, their anti-submarine suite. Seven Flight I ships—DDG 51–53, 57, 61, 65, 69—received the full $270 million Baseline 9 upgrade. Deputy of surface warfare Dave McFarland said that this change was due to the budget cuts in the Budget Control Act of 2011.

In 2016, the Navy announced it would begin outfitting 34 Flight IIA Arleigh Burke vessels with a hybrid-electric drive (HED) to lower fuel costs. The four LM2500 gas turbines of the Arleigh Burkes are most efficient at high speeds; an electric motor was to be attached to the main reduction gear to turn the drive shaft and propel the ship at speeds under , such as during BMD or maritime security operations. Use of the HED for half the time could extend time on station by 2.5 days before refueling.

Also in 2016, four destroyers of the U.S. 6th Fleet based in Naval Station Rota, Spain (USS Carney, USS Ross, USS Donald Cook, and USS Porter) received self-protection upgrades, replacing one of their two Phalanx CIWS with a SeaRAM CIWS, which combines the Phalanx sensor dome with an 11-cell RIM-116 launcher. This was the first time the system was paired with an Aegis ship. Another four ships (USS Arleigh Burke, USS Roosevelt, USS Bulkeley, and USS Paul Ignatius) have since been forward-deployed to Rota and also received a SeaRAM.

The AN/SLQ-32 EW suite used by the class is currently being upgraded under the Surface Electronic Warfare Improvement Program (SEWIP). The SEWIP Block 2 (AN/SLQ-32(V)6) features improved electronic support capability, and it was first installed on Arleigh Burke-class destroyers in 2014. As of 2022, it is in full-rate production for installation on the latest Arleigh Burke-class destroyers and for retrofit on existing ones, replacing their existing (V)2 and (V)3 equipment. The SEWIP Block 3 (AN/SLQ-32(V)7) will improve ships' electronic attack capability.

In February 2018, Lockheed Martin received a contract to deliver its High Energy Laser and Integrated Optical-dazzler with Surveillance (HELIOS) system for installation onto an Arleigh Burke destroyer. It would be the first laser weapon put on a warship. In November 2019,  had the Optical Dazzling Interdictor, Navy (ODIN) system installed, which was publicly revealed in February 2020. HELIOS underwent land-based testing from August 2021 to March 2022. Preble is expected to begin at-sea testing of the HELIOS in FY2023.

In FY2019, the Navy started a program to procure the Mod 4 variant of the Mark 38 Machine Gun System to address "unmanned aerial systems (UAS) and high speed maneuverable unmanned surface vehicle (USV) threats." Mod 4 will incorporate the 30 mm Mk44 Bushmaster II instead of the 25 mm M242 Bushmaster of previous variants, intended to improve accuracy, increase lethality, and increase effective range. The Mk 38 Mod 4 was scheduled to achieve IOC on Arleigh Burke-class destroyers in FY2022, and it will be fielded on Flights IIA and III.

In October 2020, National Security Advisor Robert C. O'Brien said that all three Flights of the Arleigh Burke-class destroyer would field the Common-Hypersonic Glide Body (C-HGB) missile developed under the Conventional Prompt Strike program. Installing them on Arleigh Burke destroyers would require removing some Mk 41 cells to accommodate the larger weapon, an expensive and time-consuming process. There is criticism of this idea: the oldest Flight I ships would need a service life extension to justify refit costs that would only prolong their service lives a short time when they are already more expensive to operate, and the newest Flight III ships that are optimized for BMD would be given a new, complex mission requiring a major refit shortly after introduction.

In December 2021, the Navy awarded Raytheon a $237 million contract for integration and production support to upgrade Flight IIA ships from AN/SPY-1D to AN/SPY-6(V)4. This upgrade would provide capabilities similar to Flight III ships, such as integrated air and missile defense with the ability to track multiple ballistic missile or air targets. Due to the smaller superstructure of the Flight IIA ships compared to Flight III ships, the radar implementation will be scaled down from the Flight III AN/SPY-6(V)1 version with fewer (24 vs. 37) radar module assemblies (RMAs).

Production restarted 

 was originally intended to be the last of the Arleigh Burke class. The class was scheduled to be replaced by Zumwalt-class destroyers beginning in 2020. However, an increasing threat from both long- and short-range missiles caused the Navy to restart production of the Arleigh Burke class in place of the Zumwalt class and consider placing littoral combat mission modules on the new ships. The U.S. Navy has been producing Arleigh Burke-class destroyers for longer than any other surface combatant class in the Navy's history.

In April 2009, the Navy announced a plan limiting the Zumwalt class to three units while ordering another three Arleigh Burke-class ships from both Bath Iron Works and Ingalls Shipbuilding. Shipbuilding contracts for DDG-113 to DDG-115 were awarded in mid-2011 for $679.6 million–$783.6 million; these do not include government-furnished equipment such as weapons and sensors, which will take the average cost of the FY2011/12 ships to $1.843 billion per vessel.

DDG-113 to DDG-115 are "restart" ships, similar to previous Flight IIA ships, but including modernization features such as Open Architecture Computing Environment and the TB-37U MFTA, which is being backfit onto previous Flight IIA ships.

DDG-116 to DDG-121 will be "Technology Insertion" ships with elements of the future Flight III. For example,  and onwards have the AN/SPQ-9B instead of the AN/SPS-67, a feature planned for Flight III. Flight III proper began with the third ship procured in 2016, .

In spite of the production restart, the U.S. Navy is expected to fall short of its requirement for 94 destroyer or cruiser platforms capable of missile defense starting in FY2025 and continuing past the end of the 30-year planning window. While this was a new requirement as of 2011, and the U.S. Navy has never had so many large missile-armed surface combatants, the relative success of the Aegis BMD System has shifted this national security requirement onto the U.S. Navy. The shortfall will arise as older platforms that have been refitted to be missile-defense-capable (particularly the cruisers) are retired in bulk before new destroyers are planned to be built.

The U.S. Navy was considering extending the acquisition of Arleigh Burke-class destroyers into the 2040s, according to revised procurement tables sent to Congress, with the procurement of Flight IV ships from 2032 through 2041. This was canceled to cover the cost of the s, with the air defense commander role retained on one cruiser per carrier strike group.

In April 2022, the Navy proposed a procurement plan for nine ships, with an option for a tenth, to build two ships a year from 2023 to 2027. Some lawmakers pushed to add a third ship to be built in 2023, bringing the total of the proposed deal to eleven ships. This would follow the Navy's two-ship per year procurement from 2018 to 2022.

Flight III 

It was anticipated that in FY2012 or FY2013, the U.S. Navy would commence detailed work for a Flight III design and request 24 ships to be built from 2016 to 2031. The Flight III variant was in the design phase . In June 2013, the U.S. Navy awarded $6.2 billion in destroyer contracts.

Costs for the Flight III ships increased rapidly as expectations and requirements for the program have grown. In particular, this was due to the changing requirements needed to carry the proposed Air and Missile Defense Radar (AMDR) system required for the ships' BMD role. The Government Accountability Office (GAO) found that the design of the Flight III was based on "a significantly reduced threat environment from other Navy analyses" and that the new ships would be "at best marginally effective" because of the "now-shrunken radar". The U.S. Navy disagreed with the GAO findings, stating that the DDG-51 hull was "absolutely" capable of fitting a large enough radar to meet requirements.

The AN/SPY-6 AMDR uses an active electronically scanned array with digital beamforming instead of the earlier passive electronically scanned array radars. According to Raytheon, the contractor for the SPY-6, the 37-RMA SPY-6(V)1 offers a 15 dB improved sensitivity compared to SPY-1. The Flight III's AMDR will be integrated with Aegis Baseline 10.

14 Flight III ships have been ordered, and Flight III IOC is scheduled for 2023 with the commissioning of USS Jack H. Lucas. The U.S. Navy may procure up to 42 Flight III ships for an overall total of 117 ships of the class.

Replacement

In April 2014, the U.S. Navy began the development of a new destroyer to replace the Arleigh Burke class called the "Future Surface Combatant". The new class is expected to enter service in the early 2030s and initially serve alongside the Flight III DDGs. The destroyer class will incorporate emerging technologies like lasers, onboard power-generation systems, increased automation, and next-generation weapons, sensors, and electronics.

The Future Surface Combatant may place importance on the Zumwalt-class destroyer's electric drive system that provides propulsion while generating 58 megawatts of electrical power, levels required to operate future directed energy weapons. Initial requirements for the Future Surface Combatant will emphasize lethality and survivability. The ships must also be modular to allow for inexpensive upgrades of weaponry, electronics, computing, and sensors over time as threats evolve. The Future Surface Combatant has evolved into the Large Surface Combatant, which became the DDG(X).

Operational history

The class saw its first combat action through Tomahawk Land Attack Missile (TLAM) strikes against Iraq. Over 3 and 4 September 1996,  and  launched 13 and eight TLAMs, respectively, as part of Operation Desert Strike. In December 1998, Arleigh Burke-class destroyers again performed TLAM strikes as part of Operation Desert Fox. 11 Arleigh Burkes supported carrier strike groups engaged in Operation Iraqi Freedom, which included TLAM launches against ground targets in operation's opening stages in 2003.

In October 2011, the Navy announced that four Arleigh Burke-class destroyers would be forward-deployed in Europe to support the NATO missile defense system. The ships, to be based at Naval Station Rota, Spain, were named in February 2012 as Ross, Donald Cook, Porter, and Carney. By reducing travel times to station, this forward deployment allows for six other destroyers to be shifted from the Atlantic in support of the Pivot to East Asia. Russia threatened to quit the New START treaty over this deployment, calling it a threat to their nuclear deterrent. In 2018, CNO Admiral John Richardson criticized the policy of keeping six highly mobile BMD platforms "in a little tiny box, defending land", a role that he believed could be performed equally well at less cost by shore-based systems.

In October 2016, the Arleigh Burke-class destroyers Mason and Nitze were deployed to the coast of Yemen after a UAE auxiliary ship was struck in an attack for which Houthi rebels claimed responsibility. On 9 October, while in the Red Sea, Mason detected two anti-ship missiles headed toward herself and nearby USS Ponce fired from Houthi-controlled territory. Mason launched two SM-2s, one ESSM, and a Nulka decoy. One AShM was confirmed to have struck the water on its own, and it is unknown if the second missile was intercepted or hit the water on its own. On 13 October, Nitze conducted TLAM strikes destroying three Houthi radar sites used in the previous attacks. Back in the Red Sea, Mason experienced a third attack on 15 October with five AShMs. She fired SM-2s and decoys, destroying or neutralizing four missiles. Nitze neutralized the fifth missile with a radar decoy.

On 7 April 2017, the Arleigh Burke-class destroyers Ross and Porter conducted a TLAM strike against Shayrat Airfield, Syria, in response to Syrian President Bashar Assad's chemical attack on his people three days prior. The ships fired a total of 59 Tomahawk missiles. On 14 April 2018, Laboon and Higgins conducted another TLAM strike against Syria. They fired seven and 23 TLAMs, respectively. The strike targeted chemical weapon sites as part of a continued effort against Assad's use of chemical warfare. The Arleigh Burke-class destroyers Donald Cook and Winston S. Churchill took positions in the Mediterranean prior to the 2018 strike to mislead defending forces.

Accidents and major incidents

USS Cole bombing

 was damaged on 12 October 2000 in Aden, Yemen, while docked by an attack in which a shaped charge of 200–300 kg in a boat was placed against the hull and detonated by suicide bombers, killing 17 crew members. The ship was repaired and returned to duty in 2001.

USS Porter and MV Otowasan collision

On 12 August 2012, USS Porter collided with the oil tanker MV Otowasan near the Strait of Hormuz; there were no injuries. The U.S. Navy removed Porters commanding officer from duty. Repairs took two months at a cost of $700,000.

USS Fitzgerald and MV ACX Crystal collision

On 17 June 2017,  collided with the MV ACX Crystal cargo ship near Yokosuka, Japan. Seven sailors drowned. Following an investigation, the ship's commanding officer, executive officer, and Command Master Chief Petty Officer were relieved of their duties. In addition, close to a dozen sailors were given non-judicial punishment for losing situational awareness. Repairs were originally to be completed by the summer of 2019. However, initial repairs were made by February 2020. After the subsequent sea trials, she was brought in for additional repairs. The ship departed for her home port in June 2020.

USS John S. McCain and Alnic MC collision

On 21 August 2017, USS John S. McCain collided with the container ship Alnic MC. The collision injured 48 sailors and killed 10, whose bodies were all recovered by 27 August. The cause of the collision was determined to be poor communication between the two ships and the bridge crew lacking situational awareness. In the aftermath, the ship's top leadership, including the commanding officer, executive officer, and Command Master Chief Petty Officer, were removed from command. In addition, top leadership of the U.S. Seventh Fleet, including the commander, Vice Admiral Joseph Aucoin, were relieved of their duties due to a loss of confidence in their ability to command. Other commanders who were relieved included Rear Admiral Charles Williams, commander of Task Force 70, and Captain Jeffrey Bennett, commodore of Destroyer Squadron 15. This was the third incident involving a U.S. Navy ship in 2017, with a repair cost of over $100 million.

Contractors
Builders: 37 units constructed by General Dynamics, Bath Iron Works Division, and 33 by Huntington Ingalls Industries (formerly Northrop Grumman Ship Systems), Ingalls Shipbuilding
AN/SPY-1 radar and Aegis Combat System integrator: Lockheed Martin
AN/SPY-6 radar: Raytheon

Ships in class

Derivatives 
The Japanese Maritime Self-Defense Force (JMSDF) and the Republic of Korea Navy (ROKN) have adopted destroyer classes modeled on the Arleigh Burke class.

  (JMSDF)
  (JMSDF)
  (JMSDF)
  (ROKN)

In popular culture 
The 2012 film Battleship features the Arleigh Burke-class destroyer .

The 2014 television series The Last Ship, loosely based on the 1988 novel of the same name, is set on the fictional . Its hull designation in the book is DDG-80, but it was changed to DDG-151 for the television series to avoid confusion with the real-life USS Roosevelt, which did not exist when the book was written. , a Flight IIA Arleigh Burke-class destroyer, stood in for Nathan James during filming.

See also
 List of naval ship classes in service
 List of current ships of the United States Navy

Notes

References

Citations

Bibliography

Further reading

External links

 Arleigh Burke-class destroyers at Destroyer History Foundation
 Arleigh Burke unit list on globalsecurity.org
 Arleigh Burke class (Aegis) page on naval-technology.com
 Arleigh Burke Flight I & Flight II Class destroyer- United States Navy on navyrecognition.com

 
Naval ships of the United States
Destroyer classes